Robbie van Leeuwen (born 29 October 1944) is a Dutch musician who was a guitarist, sitarist, background vocalist and main songwriter for Dutch bands, including The Motions and Shocking Blue. In 1967 he played guitar on the only single ever released by "The Six Young Riders" titled "Let the Circle Be Unbroken". As of January 2023, he is the only surviving member of Shocking Blue's best known four-piece lineup.

Career 
In 1970 he was in the band Shocking Blue, which had a No. 1 hit with the single "Venus". In 1974 he left Shocking Blue and released the successful single "Long Hot Summer" with his new band Galaxy-Lin. He was the founder and main composer for this band which released two albums: "Galaxy Lin" in 1974 and "G" in 1975. The singer was Rudy Bennett, with whom van Leeuwen had already collaborated in another band, called The Motions. Galaxy-Lin disbanded in 1976. Together with Rick van der Linden, van Leeuwen founded "Mistral" in 1977. This group scored three hits during this period, "Jamie", "Starship 109" and "Neon City". The main instrument used was the synthesizer. The group produced three more singles in 1980, but these were not as successful as the earlier ones. In 1984 he released two more singles under the name "Cat's Eye". Except for producing two singles for former Shocking Blue singer Mariska Veres, a 1977 song titled "Too Young" and a 1994 song titled "Body and Soul", Robbie van Leeuwen withdrew from the music business and moved to Luxembourg.

In 2013 he received the Buma Lifetime Achievement Award. As of 2018 he, again, lives in the Netherlands, in Wassenaar. In January 2019 he was interviewed on Dutch television during a broadcast of the daily talkshow 'De Wereld Draait Door' in connection with his 75th birthday in October of the same year. It was his first interview in years since Van Leeuwen is known to be very media-shy. Several bands played compositions by Van Leeuwen in 'De Wereld Draait Door' after this broadcast during the coming weeks.

His best-known compositions are Shocking Blue's most famous songs: "Venus", which was in 1970 a US and UK No. 1 hit and was covered by Bananarama and "Love Buzz", which was covered by Nirvana and released as their first single, and "Daemon Lover".

References

External links

1944 births
Living people
Dutch rock guitarists
Dutch male guitarists
English-language singers from the Netherlands
Musicians from The Hague
Dutch songwriters
Lead guitarists